The third season of the American television series Supergirl, which is based on the DC Comics character Supergirl / Kara Zor-El, focuses on a costumed superhero who is the cousin to Superman and one of the last surviving Kryptonians.

The season was ordered in January 2017. It was filmed from July 2017 to April 2018, and filming took place in Vancouver. Alongside Melissa Benoist, who stars in the titular role, principal cast members Mehcad Brooks, Chyler Leigh, Jeremy Jordan, Chris Wood and David Harewood return from the second season. They are joined by Katie McGrath, who was promoted to a series regular from her recurring status in the previous season, and new cast member Odette Annable. Former series regulars Calista Flockhart and Floriana Lima return as guest star and recurring respectively.

The season premiered on The CW on October 9, 2017, and ran until June 18, 2018, over 23 episodes. The series was renewed for a fourth season on April 2, 2018.

Episodes

Cast and characters

Main 
 Melissa Benoist as Kara Danvers / Kara Zor-El / Supergirl
 Mehcad Brooks as James Olsen / Guardian
 Chyler Leigh as Alex Danvers
 Jeremy Jordan as Winslow "Winn" Schott Jr.
 Katie McGrath as Lena Luthor
 Odette Annable as Samantha Arias / Reign
 Chris Wood as Mon-El / Mike Matthews
 David Harewood as J'onn J'onzz / Martian Manhunter

Recurring 
 Erica Durance as Alura Zor-El
 Emma Tremblay as Ruby Arias
 Adrian Pasdar as Morgan Edge
 Floriana Lima as Maggie Sawyer
 Andrea Brooks as Eve Teschmacher
 Carl Lumbly as M'yrnn J'onzz
 Chad Lowe as Thomas Coville
 Amy Jackson as Imra Ardeen / Saturn Girl
 Jesse Rath as Querl Dox / Brainiac 5
 Anjali Jay as Selena

Guest

"Crisis on Earth-X" 
 Stephen Amell as Oliver Queen / Green Arrow
 Amell also portrays Dark Arrow, Oliver's Earth-X counterpart
 Victor Garber as Professor Martin Stein / Firestorm
 Jesse L. Martin as Joe West
 Emily Bett Rickards as Felicity Smoak
 Caity Lotz as Sara Lance / White Canary
 Tom Cavanagh as Harrison "Harry" Wells
 Cavanagh also portrays Eobard Thawne / Reverse-Flash
 Dominic Purcell as Mick Rory / Heat Wave
 Candice Patton as Iris West
 Franz Drameh as Jefferson Jackson / Firestorm
 Danielle Panabaker as Caitlin Snow / Killer Frost
 Carlos Valdes as Cisco Ramon / Vibe
 Grant Gustin as Barry Allen / Flash
 Keiynan Lonsdale as Wally West / Kid Flash
 Patrick Sabongui as David Singh
 Isabella Hofmann as Clarissa Stein
 Christina Brucato as Lily Stein
 Danielle Nicolet as Cecile Horton
 Jessica Parker Kennedy as a caterer

Production

Development
On January 8, 2017, The CW renewed Supergirl for a third season. Series co-creator Ali Adler decided not to return as showrunner for season 3, and instead remained as a consultant. Jessica Queller and Robert Rovner served as the showrunners alongside series co-creator Andrew Kreisberg.

Writing
Jessica Queller described the theme of the season as being "What does it mean to be human?". Robert Rovner and Queller also said that the season would continue to explore Lena Luthors struggle with her family's legacy, with Rovner explaining, "I think one of the central issues about Lena is that she comes from this family of bad guys and I think her journey is – and we've see her grapple with it in Season 2 – is she on the side of good or is she on the side of bad?". The season also sees Alex Danvers breaking up with Maggie Sawyer, who she met in season two. Kreisberg said the writers chose Alex wanting children and Maggie not wanting them as the reason for the breakup since he felt it was a "true human experience", considering that some employees in the writer's room broke up with their lovers because of differing views over wanting children. He also said that despite the breakup, Alex and Maggie still love each other, evident by them sleeping together after breaking up. The season also sees Kara Danvers / Supergirl and Mon-El again parting ways; Queller compared this separation to that of Humphrey Bogart and Ingrid Bergman's characters in the ending of Casablanca (1942), saying, "They both have destinies in different times as heroes. What they did was the sort-of Casablanca decision of putting what's most important to them – which is saving the world – first."

Casting
Main cast members Melissa Benoist, Mehcad Brooks, Chyler Leigh, Jeremy Jordan, Chris Wood and David Harewood return from previous seasons in their respective roles as Kara, James Olsen, Alex, Winn Schott, Mon-El and J'onn J'onzz / Martian Manhunter. They are joined by Katie McGrath and Odette Annable, playing Lena Luthor and Samantha Arias / Reign, respectively. McGrath was promoted from her recurring status in season two. Floriana Lima, who portrayed Maggie Sawyer as a regular in season two, was demoted to a recurring role in season three as Lima wanted to pursue other opportunities. She had been contracted only for one season (the second), but agreed to appear in five episodes of the third season. This is also the final season to feature Wood, who Rovner said was intended to appear in only two seasons. Jordan too exited the series as a regular with this season, as he wanted to begin "a new chapter in [his] life".

Filming
Filming for the season began on July 6, 2017 and ended on April 28, 2018, taking place in Vancouver.

Arrowverse tie-ins 
In May 2017, The CW president Mark Pedowitz officially announced plans for a four-show Arrowverse crossover event, crossing over episodes of the television series Supergirl, The Flash, Legends of Tomorrow, and Arrow. The crossover, Crisis on Earth-X, began with Supergirl and a special airing of Arrow on November 27, 2017, and concluded on The Flash and Legends of Tomorrow on November 28. The crossover also sees Benoist, Brooks and Jordan playing the Earth-X versions of their characters.

Release

Broadcast
The season premiered on The CW in the United States on October 9, 2017, and ended on June 18, 2018. It premiered on October 16, 2017 in the United Kingdom on Sky One.

Home media
The season was released on DVD on September 17, 2018, and Blu-ray on September 18, 2018.

Reception

Ratings

Critical response
The review aggregator website Rotten Tomatoes gave the third season an 80% approval rating from critics with an average rating of 7.32/10, based on 13 reviews. The site's consensus reads, "Heavier themes lead to higher stakes, but Supergirl gives its eponymous heroine and her fellow supers plenty of room for growth, creating a well-balanced, engaging third season."

Jesse Schedeen of IGN rated the season premiere 7.5 out of 10, saying it "largely focusing on what's worked best for the show in the past – emphasizing Kara Danvers' never-ending struggle to balance her personal and superhero lives and the inspirational symbol Supergirl has become to National City", but added that "the lackluster debut of new villain Morgan Edge does little to suggest the series will improve on its perpetual villain woes". In his review of the season finale he said, "Supergirls third season ended on a fairly mixed note. The season has taken a recent downturn thanks to the shift in focus regarding Reign and her mistresses, and [the season finale] wasn't able to repair that damage. However, it did benefit from some great, emotionally charged scenes and a generally strong emphasis on Kara and her supporting cast."

Accolades

|-
! scope="row" rowspan="9" | 2018
| People's Choice Awards
| The Sci-Fi/Fantasy Show of 2018
| Supergirl
| 
| 
|-
| rowspan="3" | Saturn Awards
| Best Actress on a Television Series
| data-sort-value="Benoist, Melissa" | Melissa Benoist
| 
| 
|-
| Best Superhero Adaptation Television Series
| Supergirl
| 
| 
|-
| Best Supporting Actress on Television
| data-sort-value="Annable, Odette" | Odette Annable
| 
| 
|-
| rowspan="5" | Teen Choice Awards
| Choice Action TV Actor
| data-sort-value="Wood, Chris" | Chris Wood
| 
| 
|-
| Choice Action TV Actress
| data-sort-value="Benoist, Melissa" | Melissa Benoist
| 
| 
|-
| Choice Action TV Show
| Supergirl
| 
| 
|-
| Choice Scene Stealer
| data-sort-value="McGrath, Katie" | Katie McGrath
| 
| 
|-
| Choice TV Villain
| data-sort-value="Annable, Odette" | Odette Annable
| 
| 
|-
! scope="row" rowspan="1" | 2019
| Leo Awards
| Best Stunt Coordination in a Dramatic Series
| data-sort-value="Brooks, Dustin" |Dustin Brooks, Simon Burnett, James Michalopoulos ("Shelter from the Storm")
| 
| 
|}

Notes

References

External links
 
 

2017 American television seasons
2018 American television seasons
Supergirl (TV series) seasons